Executive Order 13959 is a U.S. Presidential Executive Order signed on November 12, 2020, by President Donald Trump. Its title, and stated goal, is "Addressing the Threat From Securities Investments That Finance Communist Chinese Military Companies."  

It is essentially no longer in force since its first five paragraphs, the key substantive provisions, were superseded by Executive Order 14032 ("Addressing the Threat From Securities Investments That Finance Certain Companies of the People's Republic of China"), signed by President Biden on June 3, 2021.  The national emergency declared by E.O. 13959 remains in effect, however, and was expanded by E.O. 14032.

Prohibiting investment in "Communist Chinese military companies"
The executive order prohibits all U.S. investors (institutional and retail investors alike) from purchasing or investing in securities of companies identified by the U.S. government as "Communist Chinese military companies". A "Communist Chinese military company" is any company that the U.S. Department of Defense has identified pursuant to Section 1237 of the National Defense Authorization Act for Fiscal Year 1999. The prohibition came into effect on January 11, 2021. On December 28, 2020, guidance on the executive order was published clarifying that the order included subsidiaries of the relevant companies. On January 13, 2021, President Trump strengthened the executive order's requirements by issuing Executive Order 13974 ("Amending Executive Order 13959—Addressing the Threat From Securities Investments That Finance Communist Chinese Military Companies"), which mandated divestment by November 11, 2021.

List of affected companies
Initially, 31 companies were identified, including two companies whose shares were traded on U.S. exchanges. These include companies in aerospace, shipbuilding, construction, technology and communication industries.

On December 3, 2020, the Department of Defense designated four additional companies as owned or controlled by the Chinese military, taking the total number of affected companies to 35.

On January 14, 2021, the Department of Defense designated nine additional companies as owned or controlled by the Chinese military, taking the total number of affected companies to 44.

Delistings
As a consequence of the executive order, the New York Stock Exchange in January ended trading of shares in China Mobile, China Telecom and China Unicom, and announced in late February that trading in CNOOC would also cease on March 9, 2021.

See also
 Executive Order 14032

References

Executive orders of Donald Trump
China–United States relations
United States sanctions
Sanctions against China
Geopolitical rivalry